The Jameh Mosque of Meymeh is a historical mosque in Meymeh, Iran. The mosque was built during the Safavid era.

See also 
 List of the historical structures in the Isfahan province

References 

Mosques in Iran
Mosques in Isfahan Province